This article serves as an index of major characters in the fictional setting of Robert Jordan's The Wheel of Time series, with a description of their main roles or feats in the series. The Wheel of Time has 2787 distinct named characters.



A
 Logain Ablar: Previously a False Dragon; gentled by the White Tower and Healed by Nynaeve al'Meara; later a sworn ally to Rand al'Thor and a leading Asha'man. In A Memory of Light, Logain becomes the new leader of the Black Tower.
 Jonan Adley: Early recruit of the Black Tower. Killed when Rand al'Thor lost control of Callandor in Altara.
 : One of the Forsaken; originally named Ishar Morrad Chuain. Creator of Trollocs, gholam, and other Shadowspawn. Killed at the Eye of the World by Rand. Later reincarnated by the Dark One as Osan'gar. Vanquished as Saidin was being cleansed.
 Dermid Ajala: Blacksmith of Tear
 Lelaine Akashi: Aes Sedai, Sitter, and First Selector of the Blue Ajah.
 : Deceased commander of the Band of the Red Hand.
 Algarin Pendaloan: Tairen Lord with potential to be an Asha'man. Part of Logain's faction in the Black Tower, under the name "Emarin".
 Alivia: Former Seanchan damane. Most powerful female channeler alive.
 Katerine Alruddin: Black Ajah sister formerly of the Red Ajah. Killed in Tel'aran'rhiod by Egwene al'Vere. 
Doesine Alwain: Aes Sedai of the Yellow Ajah. She was part of the group of Aes Sedai using the Oath Rod to reveal sisters of the Black Ajah in the White Tower. She was killed in the Last Battle.
 : A previous False Dragon who conquered nearly half of the Westlands in the War of the Second Dragon. Defeated by Artur Hawkwing, and gentled by the White Tower.
 Merana Ambrey: Aes Sedai of the Grey Ajah.
 Amys: Aiel Wise One. One of Aviendha's and Egwene's primary mentors.
 Setalle Anan: Former Aes Sedai of the Brown Ajah who was burned out and becomes an innkeeper in Ebou Dar.
 Sashalle Anderly: Aes Sedai of the Red Ajah stilled by Rand and Healed by Damer Flinn.
 Estean Andiama: Lieutenant-General in the Band of the Red Hand, he commands the cavalry of the Murandy contingent, particularly three banners of horse.
 Rianna Andomeran: Black Ajah sister formerly of the White Ajah. Held prisoner in a stedding.
 Anlee: Aes Sedai and former Sitter of the Blue Ajah.
 Aram: A young Tuatha'an (tinker) who joined with Perrin after renouncing the Way of the Leaf after seeing others tinkers killed by Trollocs.  Eventually he tried to kill Perrin, after being corrupted by Masema into believing Perrin was shadowspawn.
 Naean Arawn: Andoran noblewoman. Attempts to claim the Lion Throne following Morgase's disappearance, but is arrested and imprisoned by Dyelin. Later freed by Arymilla and forced to support her claim to the throne. Taken prisoner by Elayne after Arymilla's attack on Caemlyn is foiled, and stripped of all lands and titles. Later offered new lands in Cairhien by Elayne.
 Lyrelle Arienwin: Aes Sedai and Sitter of the Blue Ajah.
 Asmodean: One of the Forsaken; originally named Joar Addam Nessosin. In The Shadow Rising, Lanfear, another Forsaken, forces Asmodean to become Rand al'Thor's mentor. Balefired by Graendal.
 Saerin Asnobar: Aes Sedai and Sitter of the Brown Ajah. She was part of the group of Aes Sedai using the Oath Rod to reveal sisters of the Black Ajah in the White Tower.
 Rhadam Asunawa: High Inquisitor, leader of the Hand of the Light (an organisation within the Children of the Light). His fanaticism ultimately proved too much even for the other Children, and he was executed to make way for Galad to become Lord Captain Commander.
 Aviendha: Aiel. Maiden of the Spear, later a Wise One, and one of Rand al'Thor's paramours.
 Perrin Aybara: ta'veren; Central character of the series; former blacksmith and woodworker; capable of telepathic communication with wolves, as well as being able to visit Tel'aran'rhiod. Named 'Young Bull' by the wolves and 'Lord Goldeneyes' by his followers. Husband of Faile Bashere.
 Edesina Azzedin: Aes Sedai sister of the Yellow Ajah and former damane.

B
 Bain: Aiel Maiden of the Spear. First-Sister to Chiad.
 Bair: Wise One of the Haido sept of the Shaarad Aiel. Cannot channel, but is an experienced dreamwalker.
 : One of the Forsaken; originally named Eval Ramman. Killed at the Eye of the World by the Green Man. Later reincarnated by the Dark One as Aran'gar, in a female body. Is balefired when Rand destroys Graendal's lair.
 Sebban Balwer: Secretary and spymaster to Perrin Aybara, former spymaster for Pedron Niall of the Children of the Light.
 Teslyn Baradon: Aes Sedai of the Red Ajah. Briefly damane.
 : Aes Sedai of the Yellow Ajah.
 Duhara Basaheen: Black Ajah sister formerly of the Red Ajah. Killed by Aviendha.
 Davram Bashere: One of the five 'Great Captains'. Born in Saldaea. Commanded the Army of the Light in Caemlyn in the Last Battle, where he died.
 Zarine (Faile) Bashere: Daughter of Davram Bashere. Wife of Perrin Aybara. Cousin to the queen of Saldaea.
 Adelorna Bastine: Aes Sedai and Captain-General of the Green Ajah.
 : Black Ajah sister formerly of the Blue Ajah. Once the Mistress of Novices, then Egwene's Keeper of the Chronicles until discovered and purged.
 Be'lal: One of the Forsaken; originally named Duram Laddel Cham. Known as the Netweaver. Infiltrated Tear under the alias of Lord Samon. Balefired by Moiraine Damodred during the battle for the Stone of Tear.
 : Aes Sedai sister of the Green Ajah and Captain-General for the rebels.
 Falion Bhoda: Black Ajah sister formerly of the White Ajah. Killed by Aviendha.
 Nesune Bihara: Aes Sedai sister of the Brown Ajah.
 Jesse Bilal: Aes Sedai and First Chair of the Brown Ajah.
 Dain Bornhald: High ranking officer of the Children of Light. The son of Geofram Bornhald who develops an obsession with Perrin after his father's death.
 Geofram Bornhald: A Lord Captain of the Children of Light. Captures Egwene and Perrin and is ultimately killed by Seanchan at Falme.
 Erian Boroleos: Aes Sedai of the Green Ajah.
 : Aes Sedai of the Red Ajah. Former Mistress of Novices and Keeper of the Chronicles to Egwene.
 : One of the five 'Great Captains'. Originally from Andor. Suspected paramour of Queen Morgase. Warder to Siuan Sanche. Commanded the Army of the Light in Kandor in the Last Battle, in which he died.
 Joiya Byir: Black Ajah sister formerly of the Grey Ajah. Killed by Slayer.

C
 Jeaine Caide: Black Ajah sister formerly of the Green Ajah. Killed by Thom.
 : A Hero of the Horn, known as the lover and companion of Birgitte.
 Adine Canford: Aes Sedai of the Blue Ajah.
 Canin: Captain of the ship Darter
 Taril Canler: Asha'man in the Black Tower loyal to Logain Ablar.
 Anaiya Carel: Aes Sedai sister of the Blue Ajah. Killed by Aran'gar.
 Carlomin: A Tairen Lord. Banner-General in the Band of the Red Hand, he leads a banner of cavalry in Altara.
 Galina Casban: Black Ajah sister and former Highest of the Red Ajah. Now gai'shain of the Shaido.
 Romanda Cassin: Aes Sedai of the Yellow Ajah. Sitter and First Weaver in the Tower. Died in the Last Battle.
 Matrim (Mat) Cauthon: One of the main characters. Ta'veren and childhood companion of Perrin Aybara and Rand al'Thor; Captain-General of the Band of the Red Hand; later consort of Tuon/Fortuona, with the title 'Prince of the Ravens'. Mat is known to the Aelfinn and Eelfinn as 'Son of Battles' and to the Heroes of the Horn as 'The Gambler'. Former Hornblower of the Horn of Valere.
 Merilille Ceandevin: Aes Sedai of the Grey Ajah.
 Noal Charin: Member of the Band of the Red Hand, also known as legendary traveler ''. Hero of the Horn.
 Chiad: Aiel Maiden of the Spear. First-sister to Bain, love interest of Gaul.
 Rafela Cindal: Aes Sedai of the Blue Ajah.
 : The leader of the Shaido Aiel and false Car'a'carn. Killed by Mat Cauthon.

D
 Theodrin Dabei: Aes Sedai of the Brown Ajah.
 Zerah Dacan: Aes Sedai of the White Ajah.
 Nisao Dachen: Aes Sedai of the Yellow Ajah. Her Warder is Sarin Hoigan.
 Mistress Daelvin: Innkeeper of the Golden Stag in Maerone. (VI-138)
 Masema Dagar: Shienaran soldier. Considers himself Prophet of the Dragon. Killed by Faile.
 Caraline Damodred: Cousin of Moiraine Damodred, formerly rebel against Rand al'Thor. Wife of Darlin Sisnera
 Galadedrid (Galad) Damodred: Half-brother of Elayne and Gawyn Trakand on his father's side, and as son of Tigraine Mantear, also Rand al'Thor's half-brother. Eventually Lord Captain Commander of the Children of the Light.
 Moiraine Damodred: Aes Sedai of the Blue Ajah. Mentor to the protagonists in the first three books; supporting-character afterward. 
 : the supreme antagonist of the series; known by a variety of nicknames ('Old Grim'; 'Father of Lies'; 'Heart of the Dark'; etc.) to evade drawing his attention by repetition of his true name ('Shai'tan': i.e., Shaitan or Satan). Incapable of directly acting, but influences humanity by luring power-hungry individuals to his cause, as well as being able to create strange, unnatural and often deadly phenomenon by influencing the Pattern.
 : A previous False Dragon, gentled by the White Tower.
 Corlan Dashiva: Guise of Aginor while in the Black Tower.
 Cetalia Delarme: Aes Sedai of the Blue Ajah. Former head of the eyes-and-ears for the Blue. Killed by the Black Ajah.
 Talmanes Delovinde: A Lord of Cairhien. He leads the Altara contingent of three banners supplemented by a large group of crossbowmen. Right-hand man of Mat in the Band of the Red Hand.
 Demandred: One of the Forsaken; originally named Barid Bel Medar. Leader of the Sharans. Killed by Lan Mandragoran in the Field of Merrilor.
 Takima Deraighdin: Aes Sedai and Sitter for the Brown Ajah.
 Bayle Domon: Recurring character; Captain of the ferryboat Spray. Taken as da'covale by the Seanchan and made so'jhin by Egeanin Sarna. Later released and wedded by Egeanin.
 Norine Dovarna: Aes Sedai of the White Ajah.

E
 Eadyth: Aes Sedai and former Sitter and First Selector of the Blue Ajah.
 Elswell: Aes Sedai of unknown Ajah.
 Chesmal Emry: Black Ajah formerly of the Yellow Ajah. Killed by Elayne Trakand.
 Enkazin: Asha'man. Friend of Saml al'Seen from the Two Rivers.
 Demira Eriff: Aes Sedai of the Brown Ajah.  She has one Warder, Stevan.
 Erith: Ogier, wife of Loial.

F
 Padan Fain: traveling merchant, spying for the Dark One, who later becomes fused with Mashadar. A recurring villain. Killed by Mat. Known for carrying a dagger from Shadar Logoth, which kills anyone who touches its blade.
 Elmindreda (Min) Farshaw: Clairvoyante; one of Rand al'Thor's three principal paramours. Sees visions or auras around people's heads, which are always true. 
 : Aes Sedai of the Red Ajah. Turned to the Shadow.
 Herid Fel: Historian and philosopher from Andor. Mentor to Min Farshaw. A professor in Rand’s school in Cairhein. Rand consulted Herid on many esoteric topics. Killed by a gholam, presumably to silence him.
 Dagdara Finchey: Black Ajah sister formerly of the Yellow Ajah.
 : One of the oldest Asha'man, the first to be tested for the ability. Bonded as a Warder to Corele Hovian. Best male Talent at healing, on par with Nynaeve.
 : Aes Sedai and Sitter of the Grey Ajah.
 Careane Fransi: Black Ajah sister formerly of the Green Ajah. Killed by Vandene Namelle.
  Freidhen: Black Ajah sister formerly of the White Ajah. Head of the Black Ajah Supreme Council. Keeper to Elaida. Held prisoner in a stedding.

G
 Ryma Galfrey: Aes Sedai of the Yellow Ajah. Now a damane named Pura.
 Gaebril: Alias of the Forsaken Rahvin.
 Gaul: Aiel Stone Dog. Companion of Perrin Aybara.
 : Aes Sedai and former Sitter of the Red Ajah. Bonded by Logain and Turned to the Shadow.
 Charl Gedwyn: Asha'man that was part of the plot to kill Rand al'Thor in Cairhien. Killed by Padan Fain/Mordeth.
 Marillin Gemalphin: Black Ajah sister formerly of the Brown Ajah.
 Androl Genhald: Asha'man in the Black Tower loyal to Logain Ablar. Extremely weak in the Power but with the Talent of making Gateways. Mutually bonded to Pevara Tazanovni.
 Basel Gill: The former innkeeper of The Queen's Blessing in Caemlyn and considers himself to be a good Queen's man.
 Jur Grady: One of the original Asha'man recruits. Accompanies Perrin Aybara.
 Graendal: One of the Forsaken, a master of Compulsion. Originally named Kamarile Maradim Nindar. Killed by Shaidar Haran and resurrected by the Dark One as Hessalam. Hit by the backfiring of her own Compulsion weave during the Last Battle.
 Ailhuin Guenna: Wise Woman of Tear, provided shelter for Nynaeve, Elayne and Egwene.
 Liandrin Guirale: Black Ajah sister formerly of the Red Ajah. Now a damane.

H
 Merise Haindehl: Aes Sedai sister of the Green Ajah. Bonded the Asha'man Jahar Narishma as Warder.
 Shaidar Haran: Myrddraal. A principal agent of the Dark One.
 Morly Hardlin: One of the Asha'man in the Black Tower loyal to Logain Ablar.
 Faeldrin Harella: Aes Sedai sister of the Green Ajah. Killed in the Last Battle.
 Jurah Haret: Innkeeper of The Star in Tear.
 Bera Harkin: Aes Sedai sister of the Green Ajah.
 Yukiri Haruna: Aes Sedai and Sitter for the Grey Ajah. She was part of the group of Aes Sedai using the Oath Rod to reveal sisters of the Black Ajah in the White Tower.
 : Full name Artur Paendrag Tanreall, general and emperor who conquered most of the story's world a thousand years before the Last Battle; similar to Genghis Khan and implied to be the source of the legends of King Arthur. 
 Seaine Herimon: Aes Sedai and Sitter of the White Ajah. She was part of the group of Aes Sedai using the Oath Rod to reveal sisters of the Black Ajah in the White Tower.
 Eben Hopwil: Asha'man bonded by Daigian Moseneillin. Killed by Aran'gar as he attempts to shield his Aes Sedai from the Forsaken's attack.
 Corele Hovian: Aes Sedai of the Yellow Ajah. She bonded Asha'man Damer Flinn.
 Hurin: A 'thief-taker' in service of the King of Shienar. Has the gift of "smelling" violence. Accompanied Rand al'Thor in the world of the Portal Stones. Killed in the Last Battle.
 Hopper: Perrin Aybara's deceased wolf friend and mentor.

I
 : The most powerful member of the Forsaken; originally named Elan Morin Tedronai. Known as the "Betrayer of Hope". Caused Lews Therin Telamon to commit suicide. Resurrected as Moridin after being killed by Rand al'Thor. Chosen as Nae'blis by the Dark One. The only other man who was equal in power to Lews Therin Telamon and Rand al'Thor
 Rodel Ituralde: One of the five 'Great Captains'. Fought the Seanchan in Arad Doman until being brought to the Saldaean front by the Dragon Reborn. Commanded the Army of the Light in Shayol Ghul during the Last Battle. Almost certainly Arad Doman's new monarch after the Last Battle.

J
 Agelmar Jagad: One of the five 'Great Captains', Shienaran, leads the Borderlander Army of the Light at Tarwin's Gap during the Last Battle.
 Eldrith Jhondar: Black Ajah sister formerly of the Brown Ajah. Killed by Doilin Mellar/Daved Hanlon.
 Janduin: Former Clan Chief of the Tardaad Aiel and biological father of Rand al'Thor. Killed by Slayer in the Blight.

K
 Welyn Kajima: Asha'man.
 Furyk Karede: Seanchan Banner-General of the Deathwatch Guard, he led the search for the High Lady Tuon.
 Moria Karentanis: Aes Sedai and Sitter of the Blue Ajah. Also Black Ajah. Purged.
 Alliandre Maritha Kigarin: Queen of Ghealdan.
 Temaile Kinderode: Black Ajah sister formerly of the Gray Ajah. Killed by Doilin Mellar/Daved Hanlon.
 Tylee Kirgan: A general in the Seanchan army.
 Raefar Kisman: Asha'man that was part of the plot to kill Rand al'Thor in Cairhien.
 Kumira Dhoran: Aes Sedai of the Brown Ajah. Killed by Graendal in the Battle near Shadar Logoth.
 Mezar Kurin: Asha'man in the Black Tower loyal to Logain Ablar.

L
 : One of the Forsaken; originally known as Mierin Eronaile; sometime paramour to Lews Therin Telamon. Most powerful of the female Forsaken. Killed by Moridin in the realm of the Aelfinn, returned as Cyndane and killed by Perrin at the Last Battle.
 Annoura Larisen: Aes Sedai of the Grey Ajah, advisor and companion to Berelain, First of Mayene. Burned out rescuing Galad from his battle with Demandred.
 Atuan Larisett: Black Ajah sister formerly of the Yellow Ajah.
 Loial: Ogier. Close friend to Perrin Aybara and Rand al'Thor.
 Amathera Aelfdene Casmir Lounault: Former Panarch of Tarabon. Love interest of Juilin Sandar.
 Haral Luhhan: Blacksmith of Emond's Field.

M
 Machin Shin: 'Black Wind'; a malevolent intelligent force occupying the Ogier's 'Ways'.  Steals the souls of those who touch it.
 Elyas Machera: Wolfbrother, husband and former Warder to Rina Hafden. Friend to Perrin.
 Maigan: Aes Sedai of the Blue Ajah.
 Arel Malevin: Asha'man.
 Madresin Mandevwin: A Cairhienen. Banner-General in the Band of the Red Hand, he commands the crossbowmen temporarily attached to the Altaran cavalry contingent.
 al'Lan (Lan) Mandragoran: Former Warder to Moiraine Damodred, currently Warder and husband to Nynaeve al'Meara. King of Malkier, which was lost to the Shadow when he was a child. Greatest swordsman of the Third Age, defeated Demandred in single combat by "sheathing the sword".
 Karldin Manfor: Asha'man. Bonded as Warder by Beldeine Nyram of Green Ajah. Killed by Sharans in the Last Battle.
 Tigraine Mantear: Former Queen of Andor, mother of Galad Damodred and later of Rand al'Thor. Died giving birth on the slopes of Dragonmount.
 Beonin Marinye: Aes Sedai of the Grey Ajah.
 Arymilla Marne: Andoran noblewoman. Put forward a claim to the Lion Throne following Morgase's disappearance. Attempted to conquer Caemlyn from Elayne, but was defeated and stripped of all lands and titles. Later offered new lands in Cairhien by Elayne.
 Mashadar: Malevolent intelligence inhabiting the city of Aridhol, alias 'Shadar Logoth'. Takes the form of a killing mist. Inhabited the body of Padan Fain, who was later killed by Matrim Cauthon.
 Verin Mathwin: Black Ajah sister formerly of the Brown Ajah. Spy for the Light.
 Joline Maza: Aes Sedai of the Green Ajah.
 Nynaeve al'Meara: One of the main protagonists. Wisdom of Emond's Field and eventual Aes Sedai of the Yellow Ajah. Wife to Lan and thus Queen of Malkier. Discovered methods for healing both Stilling/Gentling and madness. 
 Cabriana Mecandes: Aes Sedai of the Blue Ajah. Tortured and killed by Semirhage.
 Meidani Eschede: Aes Sedai of the Grey Ajah.
 Cadsuane Melaidhrin: Legendary Aes Sedai of the Green Ajah. Amyrlin Seat after the Last Battle.
 Thomdril (Thom) Merrilin: Gleeman and adventurer; former bard to Queen Morgase; also her paramour. Married and Warder to Moiraine Damodred.
 Mesaana: One of the Forsaken; originally named Saine Tarasind. Incapacitated, her mind snapped in Tel'aran'rhiod by Egwene al'Vere.
 Talene Minly: Black Ajah sister formerly of the Green Ajah.
 Atal Mishraile: Asha'man loyal to Mazrim Taim.
 Beslan Mitsobar: Heir to the throne of Altara, and later King. Friend to Mat Cauthon.
 Tylin Quintara Mitsobar: Former Queen of Altara. Mother to Beslan. Kept Mat Cauthon as her paramour. Killed by a gholam.
 Miyasi: Black Ajah sister formerly of the White Ajah.
 : Wife of Lews Therin Telamon and slain by him.
 Moghedien: One of the Forsaken; originally named Lilen Moiral. Nicknamed webspinner. Now a damane.
 Luthair Paendrag Mondwin: Son of Artur Hawkwing, who sailed across the Aryth Ocean and claimed the lands of Seanchan for his father's empire.
 Mordeth: Councilor in the city of Aridhol; now a phantom destroying all intruders.
 Gitara Moroso: Advisor to Mordrellen Mantear and Keeper of the Chronicles to Tamra Ospenya. Died Foretelling the rebirth of the Dragon.
 Fedwin Morr: One of the first Asha'man. Killed by Rand al'Thor as a mercy once Morr falls victim to the taint on saidin.
 Morvrin Thakanos: Aes Sedai sister of the Brown Ajah.
 Delana Mosalaine: Black Ajah sister formerly of the Grey Ajah. Balefired by Rand in the assault on Graendal's lair.
 Daigian Moseneillin: Aes Sedai of the White Ajah. Killed by Shaidar Haran.
 Alanna Mosvani: Aes Sedai sister of the Green Ajah. Bonded to Rand. Killed by Moridin in the Last Battle.

N
 Kiruna Nachiman: Aes Sedai sister of the Green Ajah. Killed in the Last Battle.
 Malind Nachenin: Aes Sedai and former Sitter of the Green Ajah.
 Amico Nagoyin: Black Ajah sister formerly of the Yellow Ajah. Killed by Slayer.
 Aeldra Najaf: Aes Sedai of the Blue Ajah and Keeper of the Chronicles for Tamra Ospenya.
 Arlen Nalaam: Asha'man.
 Adeleas Namelle: Aes Sedai sister of the Brown Ajah. Sister to Vandene Namelle. Killed by Careane Fransi.
 Vandene Namelle: Aes Sedai sister of the Green Ajah. Sister to Adeleas Namelle. Killed by Chesmal Emry.
 Jahar Narishma: Asha'man loyal to Rand al'Thor. Bonded as Warder by Merise Haindehl.
 Berylla Naron: Black Ajah sister formerly of the Blue Ajah.
 Fager Neald: Asha'man of soldier rank. Accompanies Perrin Aybara in his mission to find Masema.
 Corianin Nedeal: Aes Sedai, Dreamer
 Ferane Neheran: Aes Sedai, Sitter, and First Reasoner the White Ajah.
 Sarene Nemdahl: Aes Sedai of the White Ajah. She is more than beautiful and her warder's name is Vitalien. Compelled and used up by Hessalam during the Last Battle.
 Aludra Nendenhald: Aludra is an Illuminator originally from Tarabon. She created the Dragons and Dragon Eggs (Cannons and exploding cannonballs) with help from Mat Cauthon and Elayne Trakand.
 Varil Nensen: Asha'man.
 Pedron Niall: Former Lord Captain Commander of the Children of the Light. One of the five 'Great Captains'.
 Dafid Norley: One of the Asha'man in the Black Tower loyal to Logain Ablar.
 Beldeine Nyram: Aes Sedai sister of the Green Ajah. Killed by Sharans in the Last Battle.

O
 Ogier: a species of anthropoid; hirsute, wide-featured, and immense in height and strength; intelligent, long-lived, and typically peaceful. Proficient in wood-carving and masonry; given to inventing long, elaborate names; immersed in historical and genealogical study; sedentary as a rule. Typically confined to the sanctuaries known as 'stedding' (a variation probably of 'Steading'), in which the One Power is inaccessible. When roused, they are a fearsome force in battle.
 Olver: Orphan and companion/adoptee to the Band of the Red Hand. Becomes Hornblower of the Horn of Valere.
 Daerid Ondin: Lieutenant-General in the Band of the Red Hand, he commands five banners of foot soldiers in the Murandy group.
 Faolain Orande: Aes Sedai of the Blue Ajah.
 Tamra Ospenya: Former Amyrlin Seat raised from the Blue Ajah. Tortured and killed by the Black Ajah.

P
 Tuon Athaem Kore Paendrag: Seanchan royal, called 'Daughter of the Nine Moons'; later becomes Empress as Fortuona Athaem Devi Paendrag. Leader of the Seanchan invasion force. Wife of Mat Cauthon. The name is a play on 'Fortune', among other references, in her relationship with Mat, to Probability. Also a Sul'dam.
 Berelain sur Paendrag Paeron: First (leading statesman) of Mayene. Romantically pursues Perrin Aybara aggressively until reaching an accommodation with his wife. Otherwise a cunning and intelligent politician and loyal ally to Perrin.
 Birlen Pena: Black Ajah sister.
 Elza Penfell: Black Ajah sister formerly of the Green Ajah. Balefired by Rand.

R
 Rand al'Thor: Main protagonist of the story. The Dragon Reborn, known as the Car'a'carn or He Who Comes with the Dawn to the Aiel, known as the Coramoor to the Atha'an Miere, and known as Shadowkiller to the wolves. Born on the slopes of Dragonmount during the Aiel War. The reincarnated soul of Lews Therin Telamon.  
 Rahvin: One of the Forsaken; originally named Ared Mosinel. Used Compulsion on Queen Morgase of Andor in order to take control of the country, under the alias of Lord Gaebril. Was killed with Balefire by Rand.
 : Aes Sedai and former Sitter for the Red Ajah. Current Highest.
 : Black Ajah sister formerly of the Blue Ajah. Mistress of Novices under Tamra Ospenya. Killed in Kandor by Moiraine Damodred.
 Reimon: A Tairen Lord. Banner-General in the Band of the Red Hand, he leads a banner of horse also in Altara.
 Rhuarc: Aiel clan chief, husband to Amys and her first-sister. One of Rand's primary allies among the Aiel, and in general. Fell under Hessalam's Compulsion. Killed by Aviendha in the Last Battle.
 Manel Rochaid: Asha'man that was part of the plot to kill Rand al'Thor in Cairhien. Killed by Rand.
 Elaida Do Avriny a'Roihan: Aes Sedai of the Red Ajah. Former advisor to Queen Morgase Trakand and former Amyrlin Seat, having unseated Siuan Sanche. Sent Aes Sedai to kidnap the Dragon Reborn, a mission which resulted in several sisters being captured and forced to swear oaths of fealty to Rand al'Thor. Unwilling pawn to Black Ajah leader Alviarin most of her rule. Taken damane in a Seanchan raid against the White Tower.
 Robb Solter: Soldier in Perrin's army.

S
 Colavaere Saighan: Cairhienin noblewoman. Conspired with Elaida's Aes Sedai to have Rand captured and transported to the White Tower so she could become Queen of Cairhien. Removed from power and stripped of all titles by Rand once he returned to the Sun Palace after being rescued. Committed suicide by hanging.
 : One of the Forsaken; originally named Tel Janin Aellinsar. Took control of Illian, under the alias of Lord Brend. Killed by Mashadar in battle with Rand.
 Donalo Sandomere: Asha'man in the Black Tower loyal to Logain Ablar.
 Karale Sanghir: Black Ajah sister formerly of the Grey Ajah.
 Siuan Sanche: Aes Sedai of the Blue Ajah. Former head of the eyes-and-ears network for the Blue. Former Amyrlin Seat. Deposed and stilled. Healed by Nynaeve. Becomes Egwene's advisor and mentor as Amyrlin. Bonded Gareth Bryne. Died in the Last Battle.
 : Thief-catcher of Tear.
 Elenia Sarand: Andoran noblewoman. Attempts to claim the Lion Throne following Morgase's disappearance, but is arrested and imprisoned by Dyelin. Later freed by Arymilla and forced to support her claim to the throne. Taken prisoner by Elayne after Arymilla's attack on Caemlyn is foiled, and stripped of all lands and titles. Later offered new lands in Cairhien by Elayne.
 Saml al'Seen: Asha'man native to Emond's Field.
 Edorion Selorna: A Tairen Lord. Banner-General in the Band of the Red Hand, he leads a banner of horse in Altara under Talmanes.
 Selucia: Shadow and Voice to Empress of Seanchan. Briefly Tuon's/Fortuona's Truthspeaker.
 : One of the Forsaken; originally named Nemene Damendar Boann. Known for being exceedingly cruel and creative with torture. Masqueraded as Seanchean nobility under the alias of Anath Dorje, becoming the Truthspeaker to the Daughter of the Nine Moons. Destroyed Rand al'Thor's left hand before being captured by him. Released by Elza Penfell at which point she compelled Rand al'Thor with the Domination Band to nearly kill Elmindreda Farshaw. Balefired by Rand, who was utilizing the True Power.
 Leane Sharif: Former Aes Sedai of the Blue Ajah and now of the Green Ajah. Keeper of the Chronicles under Siuan Sanche. Deposed and stilled. Healed by Nynaeve.
 Ispan Shefar: Black Ajah sister formerly of the Blue Ajah. Killed by Careane Fransi.
 Ingtar Shinowa: Shienaran nobleman and soldier. Accompanies Rand on the hunt to reclaim the Horn of Valere, after it is stolen by Padan Fain in Fal Dara. Killed by the Seanchan in Falme.
 : Hero of the Horn. Warder to Elayne Trakand. Killed in the Last Battle.
 Betse Silvin: F. Serving-maid in the Golden Stag. Mat dances with her VI-144.
 Slayer: Being born from the merged souls of Isam Mandragoran, cousin of Lan Mandragoran, and Luc Mantear, maternal uncle of Rand Al'Thor. Hunter for the Shadow, master of Tel'aran'rhiod, enjoys killing wolves. Killed by Perrin Aybara after lengthy rivalry.
 Masuri Sokawa: Aes Sedai of the Brown Ajah. She has one Warder, Rovair Kirklin.
 Someshta: Green Man, last of the Nym. Guardian of the Eye of the World. Died killing the Forsaken Balthamel.
 Carlinya Sorevin: Aes Sedai of the White Ajah. Killed during the fight in Tel'aran'rhiod against Mesaana.
 : Aiel Wise One. Very weak in the Power, but arguably the most influential of all the Wise Ones.
 Fera Sormen: Black Ajah sister formerly of the White Ajah.
 Kairen Stang: Aes Sedai of the Blue Ajah. Killed by Aran'gar.
 : King of Illian. Kidnapped by the White Tower under Elaida.
 : A previous False Dragon who could channel.
 Aeldene Stonebridge: Aes Sedai of the Blue Ajah.
 Sulin: Aiel Maiden of the Spear, companion of both Rand and Perrin.

T
 Dobraine Taborwin: Cairhienin nobleman. Assists in the rescue of Rand from Elaida's Aes Sedai at Dumai's Wells. Later appointed steward of Cairhien by Rand.
 Mazrim Taim: Asha'man, False Dragon, and new Forsaken. M'Hael of the Black Tower. He used his position to secretly turn Asha'man to the Shadow. Killed by Egwene al'Vere in the Last Battle.
 Martyn Tallanvor: Guardsman-lieutenant loyal to Queen Morgase.
 Samitsu Tamagowa: Aes Sedai of the Yellow Ajah. Her warder is named Roshan.
 Pevara Tazanovni: Aes Sedai and Sitter for the Red Ajah. Bonded to and Bonded by Androl Genhald. She was part of the group of Aes Sedai using the Oath Rod to reveal sisters of the Black Ajah in the White Tower.
 : Dragon, Lord of Morning, Kinslayer, led the Hundred Companions in the fight against the Shadow in the War of Power before beginning the Breaking of the World.
 Therava: Shaido Aiel Wise One and master of former Black Ajah Aes Sedai Galina Casban.
  al'Thor: Protagonist; reincarnation of Lews Therin Telamon, and heir to his role. Initially the love interest of Egwene al'Vere. He is The Dragon Reborn and is known as The Car'a'carn by the Aiel, the Coramoor by the Atha'an miere and as Shadowkiller by the wolf brothers.  Fated to battle the Dark One in every life.
 Tam al'Thor: Adoptive father of Rand al'Thor. Blademaster.
 Marris Thornhill: Black Ajah sister formerly of the Brown Ajah.
 Salita Toranes: Aes Sedai and former Sitter for the Yellow Ajah.
 Peral Torval: Asha'man part of the plot to kill Rand al'Thor in Cairhien. Killed by Padan Fain.
 Seonid Traighan: Aes Sedai of the Green Ajah.
 Elayne Trakand: One of the main protagonists. Heir to the throne of Andor, and later Queen. Aes Sedai of the Green Ajah. Paramour of Rand al'Thor. Has the Talent of making ter'angreal.
 Gawyn Trakand: Brother of Elayne and half-brother to Galad Damodred. Leader of the Younglings. Warder to Egwene al'Vere. Died fighting Demandred during the Last Battle.
 Morgase Trakand: Queen of Andor. Mother of Gawyn and Elayne.
 Nicola Treehill: Novice in training with the sisters in Salidar. Killed in Tel'aran'rhiod. Has the Talent of Foretelling.

V
 Eamon Valda: Former Lord Captain Commander of the Children of the Light. Blademaster. Killed by Galad Damodred.
 Egwene al'Vere: One of the main protagonists. Initially the love interest of Rand al'Thor. Had the Talent of Dreamwalking. Discovered the counter-weave for Balefire. Former Amyrlin Seat. Bonded her love interest Gawyn Trakand until his death, then briefly Egeanin/Leilwin until shortly before her death in the Last Battle.
 Evin Vinchova: Asha'man in the Black Tower, Turned to the Shadow by Mazrim Taim. Tricked into (suicide) attacking his compatriots by Androl.

Y
 Yoeli: An officer in the Saldaean army.

Z
 Asne Zeramene: Black Ajah sister formerly of the Green Ajah. Killed by Sea Folk Windfinders.

External links

 
Lists of literary characters